Dennis Anderson (born 1960) is an American monster truck driver.

Dennis Anderson may also refer to:

Dennis Anderson (politician) (1949–2019), former provincial level politician from Alberta, Canada
 Dennis LeRoy Anderson, DWI offender with motorized recliner

See also 
Dennis Dengsø Andersen (born 1978), Danish sailor
Dennis Andersson (born 1991), Swedish speedway rider